Intermezzo II is the second EP by Norwegian black metal band Satyricon. It was released on 10 May 1999, through Moonfog Productions.

Background 

On the conception of the EP, the band have stated, "We've used mini-album format to express ourselves musically in a way that would probably break with the scarlet thread of a full-length album. Intermezzo II was meant to be an appetiser for Rebel Extravaganza, but it turned out to be more of a thing of its own."

The EP features a cover of "I.N.R.I." by Sarcófago. The cover was also included on the tribute album Tribute to Sarcófago, released by Cogumelo Records in 2001.

Track listing

Personnel 
 Satyricon

 Satyr (Sigurd Wongraven) – vocals, guitar, special effects, bass guitar on "Nemesis Divina (Clean Vision Mix)", mastering, sleeve design, styling and make-up for sleeve photos
 Frost (Kjetil-Vidar Haraldstad) – drums, riff contribution on "A Moment of Clarity", styling and make-up for sleeve photos

 Session musicians

 Sanrabb (Morten Furuly) – guitar on "A Momentof Clarity" and "INRI"
 Ingar Amlien – bass guitar on "A Momentof Clarity" and "INRI"
 Vegard Blomberg – special effects on "A Momentof Clarity" and "INRI"

 Production

 Mike Hartung – engineering
 Kai Robøle – engineering
 Espen Berg – mastering
 Union Insomnia  – sleeve design
 Marcel Lelienhoff – sleeve photography
 Sidske van der Voss – styling for sleeve photos
 Alysia Cooper – make-up for sleeve photos

References 

Satyricon (band) albums
1999 EPs
Nuclear Blast EPs